Chuck Gallagher is an American entrepreneur, speaker and author.

He is the author of Second Chances and has been featured in media outlets including Life & Health, Small Business Opportunities, Business Week, CBS, CNN, Lifetime and National Public Radio. As a business ethics speaker and author his clients include Medtronic, the FBI, U.S. Navy, University of Florida, Skanska, University of North Georgia, Barclays, and United Healthcare.

Career
Gallagher serves as a chief operating officer for a national private company, American Funeral Financial, and served as a Senior Vice-President for a public company, Stewart Enterprises. He is also the President of Ethics Resource Group and SportsEthics.com.

At 26, Gallagher became the youngest tax partner in a regional CPA firm and was one of only three CPAs in the country asked to testify before the U.S. House Ways and Means Committee on a new employee benefits provision of the tax law. During that time he authored numerous articles for national publications and has developed several continuing professional education (CPE) seminars.

In the middle of a rising career, Gallagher lost everything because he made some poor choices and has since rebuilt his career. Gallagher helps corporate employees and other audiences realize the ramifications of their ethical choices and works with firms in fraud prevention.

Background
Gallagher is a graduate of Appalachian State University and is married with two sons. He has a wide variety of interests that includes acting in local productions, writing music, and participating in his church's music department. Gallagher is also an instrument-rated private pilot.

Works

References

External links
  ChuckGallagher.com Official site
 Second Chances
 SportsEthics.com

21st-century American non-fiction writers
Businesspeople from Baltimore
American male non-fiction writers
Living people
People from Valdese, North Carolina
People from Greenville, South Carolina
Year of birth missing (living people)
21st-century American male writers